Sung Han-soo (born March 10, 1976) is a South Korean football player who played at Changwon City.

Club career 
1999–2001 Daejeon Citizen
2002–2004 Chunnam Dragons
2005–2007 Changwon City

External links
 
 N-League Player Record - 성한수 

1976 births
Living people
Association football forwards
South Korean footballers
Daejeon Hana Citizen FC players
Jeonnam Dragons players
K League 1 players
Footballers from Seoul